Meriola arcifera is a species of true spider in the family Trachelidae. It is found in Chile, Bolivia, Argentina, has been introduced into the United States (California, and Hawaii).

References

Trachelidae
Articles created by Qbugbot
Spiders described in 1886